Saint-Pierre is the third-largest commune in the French overseas department and region of Réunion. Located on the southwest side of the island, it is the capital of the French Southern and Antarctic Lands. It developed from a port built from 1854 to 1882, which was used for the trade between Asia and Europe. Today, it features 400 sites for fishing and pleasure boats, while most of the commercial traffic moved north to Le Port.

Geography 
The town of Saint-Pierre is at the beginning of the only major road N3 across the island. From here, the road leads to Le Tampon, La Plaine des Cafres and Bourg Murat. From that area, there is a relatively easy access to the Piton de la Fournaise and a starting point of many excursions.

Climate 
Saint-Pierre has a hot semi-arid climate (Köppen climate classification BSh), while Ligne Paradis and Ravine des Cabris's climate type has tropical savanna climate (Köppen climate classification Aw) in the southeast of the area.

Transportation 
Pierrefonds Airport is located 5.5 kilometres outside of the commune. Opened in 1999, this is a small airport for commercial traffic. It has an IATA code of ZSE.

Population

Accommodations 
There are no major hotels in Saint-Pierre. Comfort is only available at smaller houses such as converted Creole mansions and villas.

Twin towns-Sister cities 
Saint-Pierre is twinned with Beau-Bassin Rose-Hill, Mauritius.

See also
 Communes of the Réunion department

Notable people
 

Raphaël Babet

References

External links
 Saint Pierre Official website 

Communes of Réunion
Subprefectures in France